Sandy Hook is a barrier spit along the Atlantic coast of New Jersey.

Sandy Hook may also refer to:

Places

United States 

 Sandy Hook, Connecticut, a district within the town of Newtown, Connecticut
 Sandy Hook, Indiana, unincorporated community
 Sandy Hook, Kentucky, a city in Elliott County
 Sandy Hook, Maryland, an unincorporated community in Washington County
 Sandy Hook, Mississippi, an unincorporated community
 Sandy Hook, Missouri, an unincorporated community
 Sandy Hook, Virginia, an unincorporated community in Goochland County
 Sandy Hook, Wisconsin, a Census Designated Place in Grant County
 Sandy Hook, Missouri, on the National Register of Historic Places listings in Missouri, Counties L–N

Canada 

 Sandy Hook, a community in the town of Uxbridge, Ontario
 Sandy Hook, a community in the Rural Municipality of Gimli, Manitoba
 Sandy Hook, a neighborhood in the District of Sechelt, British Columbia

Other places 
 , an island in Western Australia's Recherche Archipelago

Other uses 

 Sandy Hook Elementary School shooting, a mass murder in 2012 in Newtown, Connecticut
 "Sandy's hook" or "Sandy's left hook", the "left hook" or "left turn" (westerly movement) of Hurricane Sandy in 2012, a rare event for a hurricane near the northern United States